Samuel Goldwyn Productions was an American film production company founded by Samuel Goldwyn in 1923, and active through 1959.  Personally controlled by Goldwyn and focused on production rather than distribution, the company developed into the most financially and critically successful independent production company in Hollywood's Golden Age.

History 

After the sale of his previous firm Goldwyn Pictures, Samuel Goldwyn organized his productions beginning in February 1923, initially in a partnership with director George Fitzmaurice. (Metro-Goldwyn-Mayer, created by merger in April 1924, bears Goldwyn's name, but he did not produce films there.)  Goldwyn Production's first release, Potash and Perlmutter, successfully opened in Baltimore on September 6, 1923.

Some of the early productions bear the name "Howard Productions", named for Goldwyn's wife Frances Howard, who married Goldwyn in 1925. In the 1920s, Goldwyn released films through Associated First National. Throughout the 1930s, Goldwyn released most of his films through United Artists. Beginning in 1941, Goldwyn released most of his films through RKO Radio Pictures.

With consistently high production values and directors like John Ford and Howard Hawks, Goldwyn consistently received Academy Award for Best Picture nominations: Arrowsmith (1931), Dodsworth (1936), Dead End (1937), Wuthering Heights (1939), and The Little Foxes (1941). In 1946, he won best picture for The Best Years of Our Lives.

Through the 1940s and 1950s, many of Goldwyn's films starred Danny Kaye. Goldwyn's final production was the 1959 version of Porgy and Bess.

Elements for many films produced by Samuel Goldwyn Productions between 1929 and 1955 are held by the Academy Film Archive as part of the Samuel Goldwyn Collection.

Filmography

Distribution 
As of 2012, the distribution rights of Samuel Goldwyn films from the library were transferred to Warner Bros., with Paramount Pictures (via Miramax) managing global licensing, with the exception of The Hurricane, which is now back with its original distributor, United Artists. Studio Distribution Services, LLC., a joint venture between Warner Bros. Home Entertainment and Universal Pictures Home Entertainment, distributes the entire Samuel Goldwyn catalog on home video, including The Hurricane, via a distribution deal with MGM Home Entertainment.

See also 
 Goldwyn Pictures, the film production and distribution company active from 1916 and merged with Metro Pictures and Louis B. Mayer Pictures to form Metro-Goldwyn-Mayer on April 16, 1924.
 Samuel Goldwyn Studio, informal name for the Pickford-Fairbanks Studios lot in Hollywood.
 The Samuel Goldwyn Company, founded by Samuel Goldwyn, Jr. in 1979, active through 1997.
 Samuel Goldwyn Films, founded by Samuel Goldwyn, Jr. in 2000.

References 

Mass media companies established in 1923
Mass media companies disestablished in 1959
Film production companies of the United States
Defunct American film studios